Laura Ruby is the author of twelve books, including Bone Gap, winner of the 2016 Printz Award and finalist for the 2015 National Book Award.

Bone Gap is a coming-of-age mystery about a kidnapping in a small Midwestern town, and it incorporates elements of mythology and magical realism. The New York Times Book Review called it a "lush and original young adult novel".

In an interview with Publishers Weekly, Ruby characterized her award-winning novel as an "oddball" book that doesn't fit neatly into one genre.

Biography
Ruby grew up in New Jersey, and now lives in the Chicago area.

She is a faculty member at Hamline University in the low-residency MFA program in writing for children and young adults.

She teaches fantasy writing workshops for children's authors at Highlights.

York: The Shadow Cipher (part one of a trilogy for children), was released in May 2017.

Her most recent book, Thirteen Doorways, Wolves Behind Them All, was named a finalist for the 2019 National Book Award for Young People's Literature.

Published works
Lily’s Ghosts (2003)
Everything I Wanted to Know About Being a Girl I Learned from Judy Blume (2006)
The Wall and the Wing (2006)
I'm Not Julia Roberts (2007)
The Chaos King (2007)
Good Girls (2008)
Play Me (2008)
Bad Apple (2009)
Bone Gap (2015)
York: The Shadow Cipher (2017)
York: The Clockwork Ghost (2019)
Thirteen Doorways, Wolves Behind Them All (2019)
York: The Map of Stars (2020)

References

External links
Official website
One Thing Leads to Another: An Interview with Laura Ruby

Year of birth missing (living people)
Living people
21st-century American novelists
Hamline University faculty
American women novelists
21st-century American women writers
Novelists from Minnesota
American women academics